The Street is a British drama television series created by Jimmy McGovern and produced by Granada Television for the BBC. The series follows the lives of various residents of an unnamed street in Manchester and features an all-star cast including Timothy Spall, Jim Broadbent, Jane Horrocks, Bob Hoskins, and David Thewlis.

The Street won both the British Academy Television Award for Best Drama Series and RTS Television Award for Drama Series twice, in 2007 and 2008. It also won two International Emmy Awards in November 2007 for Best Drama and Best Actor (Jim Broadbent). The second series was nominated for the Best Drama prize at the 2008 Rose d'Or ceremony. Though it did not win, it received Special Mention from the jury. In November 2010, the third series won the International Emmy Award for Best Drama and Best Actor (Bob Hoskins).

The third series began airing on 13 July 2009 and concluded on 17 August 2009. This was the final series to be made due to cutbacks at ITV Studios in Manchester (ITV produced the series, although it is shown by the BBC).

The filming location was Rock Street, Higher Broughton in Salford.

Cast
The McEvoys are the only family to appear in more than one series, with Timothy Spall and Ger Ryan reprising the roles of Eddie and Margie for at least one episode per series.

Series 1 (2006)
 Jane Horrocks as Angela Quinn
 Daniel Ryan as Arthur Quinn
 Dean McGonagle as Jamie Quinn
 Alexandra Pearson as Katy Quinn
 Shaun Dooley as Peter Harper
 Liz White as Eileen Harper
 Timothy Spall as Eddie McEvoy
 Ger Ryan as Margie McEvoy
 Jim Broadbent as Stan McDermott
 Sue Johnston as Brenda McDermott
 Neil Dudgeon as Brian Peterson
 Lindsey Coulson as Ann Peterson
 Sacha Parkinson as Shannon Peterson
 Lee Battle as Connor Peterson
 Jody Latham as Billy Roberts
 David Schofield as John Roberts
 Ciarán Griffiths as Terry
 Christine Bottomley as Yvonne O'Neill
 Lee Ingleby as Sean O'Neill
 Joanne Froggatt as Kerry
 Bronagh Gallagher as Mary Jennerson
 Steve Edge as Malcolm McKenzie
 Matthew Marsh as Bob Hewitt
 Steve Marsh as Duffy
 Jamiu Adebiyi as Ojo Asemi
 Jessica Hall as Laura Hammond
 Claire Hackett as Rachel Marsden

Series 2 (2007)
 Mark Benton as Wayne Taylor
 Melanie Hill as Val Taylor
 Michael Taylor as Damien Wood
 Vincent Regan as Charlie Morgan
 Julia Ford as Roz Morgan
 Will Mellor as Tom Dixon
 Kieran Bew as Gary Parr
 Gina McKee as Jan Parr
 Lorcan Cranitch as Danny Parr
 Matt Smith as Ian Hanley
 Oliver Stokes as Lee Hanley
 Lorraine Ashbourne as Cath Hanley
 Timothy Spall as Eddie McEvoy
 Ger Ryan as Margie McEvoy
 Matthew Marsh as Bob Hewitt
 Kim Thomson as Pat Tinsey
 David Thewlis as Harry and Joe Jennerson
 Bronagh Gallagher as Mary Jennerson
 June Watson as Maggie Jennerson
 Toby Kebbell as Paul Billerton
 Robyn Addison as Kirsty Blackwell
 Dean Andrews as Cleggy
 Jodhi May as Jean Arthur
 Jack Deam as Kevin Arthur

Series 3 (2009)
 Bob Hoskins as Paddy Gargan
 Frances Barber as Lizzie Gargan
 Liam Cunningham as Thomas Miller
 Anna Friel as Dee Purnell
 Daniel Mays as Mark Raveley
 David Bradley as Joe Raveley
 Jonas Armstrong as Nick Calshaw
 Siobhan Finneran as Kim Calshaw
 Ian Puleston-Davies as Alan Calshaw
 Emily Beecham as Gemma Robinson
 Joseph Mawle as Kieran Corrigan
 Julia Krynke as Olenka Danczuk
 Steve Marsh as Duffy
 Stephen Graham as Shay Ryan
 Maxine Peake as Madeleine Collins
 Timothy Spall as Eddie McEvoy
 Ger Ryan as Margie McEvoy
 Ruth Jones as Sandra Lucas
 Daniel Rigby as David Walsh
 Ted Robbins as Ken Jones
 Nick Fraser as Deano Jackson

Episodes

Series 1 (2006)

Series 2 (2007)

Series 3 (2009)

Reception
The Street was critically applauded during its three-year run. TV critic Nancy-Banks Smith writing for The Guardian praised "The Promise" episode from Series 2: "Everyone involved seems to have appreciated the little gem they had here. Jodhi May, acting half the time with only half her face, was almost too powerful for peace of mind. David Blair directed like a particularly gifted spider, filling the screen with holes, cracks, doorways, windows...This, the last and best play in The Street series, must have been as painful and exhilarating to write as it was to watch. I wouldn't say it was plausible. I'd say poetic."

References

External links
 
 
 

2006 British television series debuts
2000s British drama television series
2009 British television series endings
BBC television dramas
English-language television shows
International Emmy Award for Best Drama Series winners
Television series by ITV Studios
Television shows produced by Granada Television
Television shows set in Manchester